In Mandaeism, Tarwan is a section of the World of Light that is typically described as a "pure land."

The "land of Tarwan" is mentioned in Qolasta prayers 190 and 379 and Right Ginza 15.17, while "pure Tarwan" (taruan dakita), or sometimes "the pure land of Tarwan," is mentioned as a heavenly place in Right Ginza 15.2, 15.8, 15.16, and 16.1. "Tarwan-Nhura" (Tarwan of Light) is mentioned in Qolasta prayers 4 and 25.

Etymology
The etymology of Tarwan is obscure. Gelbert (2005) suggests a connection with Parvaim, a mythical land mentioned in 2 Chronicles 3:6 as a source of gold.

As an uthra
Tarwan is also the name of an uthra who is usually mentioned together with Tar. The duo Tar and Tarwan is mentioned in prayers such as the Asiet Malkia (Qolasta prayer 105).

As an uthra, Tarwan is also mentioned in Right Ginza 8.

See also
Mandaean cosmology
Mshunia Kushta
Pure land in Buddhism
Pure Land Buddhism

References

Mandaean cosmology
Mandaic words and phrases
Conceptions of heaven
Uthras
Pure lands
Afterlife places